The 7th World Team Challenge 2008 (officially: VELTINS-Biathlon-WTC 08) was a commercial biathlon competition, that was held at the 27th of December, 2008, at the Veltins-Arena in Gelsenkirchen, Germany. The winners were Andriy Deryzemlya and Oksana Khvostenko from Ukraine.

Participants 
20 sportsmen (10 male, 10 female) participated as mixed teams. Host country was represented by 3 teams. Beside that, one German athlete competed in a mixed pair with a partner from Austria. There were representatives from 7 countries, including one outside Europe.

Results

External links 
 Official Webpage of the Event

World Team Challenge
2008 in biathlon
2008 in German sport